Abraham Kithure Kindiki (born 17 July 1972) is a Kenyan politician and lawyer serving as the Cabinet Secretary of Interior and Administration of National Government. He represented Tharaka-Nithi County in the Kenyan Senate from 2013 until 2022.

Early life and education 
Kindiki was born and raised in Tharaka-Nithi County. Kindiki attended Lenana School where he scored Grade C in his Kenya Certificate of Secondary Education (KCSE). Since this grade failed to meet university pass mark he decided to retake the exam at Tharaka Boys High School.

In 1998, he obtained a Bachelor of Laws degree (LLB) from Moi University. In 2000 he obtained a Master of Laws (LLM) in International Human Rights Law and Democracy from the University of Pretoria in South Africa. He also attended the Advocates' Post Graduate Diploma in Legal Studies at the Kenya School of Law in 2001, which is a requirement for one to qualify as an advocate after completing a bachelor's degree in law. In 2002 he graduated with a PhD in International Law from the University of Pretoria.

In 1999, he began working as a law lecturer at Moi University. He started working at the University of Nairobi in 2004 and remained there until 2005, when he returned to Moi to lead the Public Law department.

Political career 
In the 2013 Kenyan general election, Kindiki was elected to represent Tharaka-Nithi County in the Senate. He was chosen to serve as the Senate's first majority leader. He was reelected in the 2017 election, and was chosen to be the Deputy Speaker of the Senate. In 2020, Kindiki was removed from the position of deputy speaker.

Kindiki was among the top candidates considered to be William Ruto's running mates for his presidential campaign. Member of Parliament Rigathi Gachagua was chosen instead. Kindiki was instead appointed to serve as the Minister of the Interior.  Mwenda Gataya succeeded him in the Senate.

Private life 
He married Joyce Gatiiria Njagi in 2001. They have two children.

References 

1972 births
Kenyan politicians
Living people
Alumni of Lenana School
Moi University alumni
University of Pretoria alumni
Academic staff of Moi University
People from Tharaka-Nithi County
Academic staff of the University of Nairobi